The International School of Geneva (in French: Ecole Internationale de Genève), also known as "Ecolint" or "The International School", is a private, non-profit international school based in Geneva, Switzerland.

Founded in 1924 in the service of the League of Nations and the International Labour Organization (the world's first international organizations), it is the oldest international school in the world, and the largest one with 'international' in its name. It was the result of a partnership between parents (Arthur Sweetser and Ludwik Rajchman) and educators from the Institut Jean-Jacques Rousseau (Adolphe Ferrière and Paul Meyhoffer). In the mid-1960s, a group of teachers from Ecolint (La Grande Boissière campus) created the International Schools Examinations Syndicate (ISES), which later became the International Baccalaureate Organization (IBO) and then the International Baccalaureate (IB). Since its inception, the school's mission was conceived as educating for peace and the inculcation of humanitarian values such as inclusiveness, respect and inter-cultural understanding. It describes itself in its website as "resolutely not-for-profit; mankind is the only beneficiary of our work, not corporate shareholders or private equity firms". In 2017, it was labelled by ITN as "the most diverse school on the planet".

Article 4 of Ecolint's Charter states that "the activity of the school in all fields and especially in the field of pedagogy shall be based on the principles of equality and solidarity among all peoples and of the equal value of all human beings without any distinction of nationality, race, sex, language or religion".

Ecolint comprises three campuses in and around Geneva, each with its own principal (also known as "director") working under the Director General of the Foundation of the International School of Geneva (currently Conrad Hughes) and a Governing Board elected by parents, staff and alumni with co-opted members from the UN and Swiss Government. Ecolint is a bilingual school, with instruction primarily in English and French. In addition to the IB, it is a testing centre for the US college boards (SAT and ACT), the British IGCSE (CIE).

Ecolint is a member of the G30 Schools Group.

History

The history of Ecolint has been charted in four volumes published in different decades. The first, bilingual one (Ecole Internationale de Genève – Son premier demi-siècle / International School of Geneva – the first 50 years, Geneva: 1974, 311 pages), edited by René Lejeune (better known as René-François Lejeune), compiles the contributions and eyewitness accounts of various authors, including the historian Robert J. Leach and Ecolint's second director, Marie-Thérèse Maurette. The second one (Ecolint – A portrait of the International School of Geneva, 1924–1999, Geneva: 1999, 218 pages) was written by the historian Michael Knight. The third volume (Marie-Thérèse Maurette – Pioneer of International Education, Geneva: 2009, 84 pages), which focuses specifically on the director who headed the school between 1929 and 1949, was authored by Professor George Walker, former Director General of Ecolint and of the International Baccalaureate Organization. The fourth and final volume to date (Ecolint – A History of the International School of Geneva, Geneva: 2014, 170 pages) is the joint work of educators Conan de Wilde (an alumnus of the school) and Othman Hamayed (a former director of La Grande Boissière's Secondary School). In addition, Robert J. Leach published privately in 1974 his own account of the school’s history, International School of Geneva, 1924–1974 (63 pages). Most recently, the geographer and economist Phil Thomas, who served as interim Director General and held a wide range of teaching positions in the school during his 35-year Ecolint career, published the booklet Ecolint and the Origins of the International Baccalaureate in 2018. (These works constitute the source for some of the information provided below.)

From 1920 to 1921 the League of Nations and the International Labour Office established their headquarters in Geneva. In 1924 the International School of Geneva was founded by senior members of these two international organizations, most notably Arthur Sweetser and Ludwik Rajchman, in partnership with Adolphe Ferrière and Paul Meyhoffer, educators from Geneva's Institut Jean-Jacques Rousseau. Meyhoffer, originally trained as a theologian, had previously taught at Bedales School in England and, for eight years, at the Ecole Nouvelle de la Châtaigneraie (also known as Ecole Nouvelle du Léman), which in 1974 was integrated into Ecolint.

Ferrière housed the first class in a chalet that was part of his family's estate, on the Route de Florissant in Geneva. He was also technical adviser to the school from 1924 to 1926. The nascent school was supported by William Rappard, Rector of the University of Geneva, the neurologist and child psychologist Édouard Claparède, and Sir Arthur Salter, a senior official of the League of Nations. After occupying rented accommodation on the Rue Charles Bonnet in Geneva's Vieille ville (Old Town), the school finally acquired its own premises in 1929: a historic site known as La Grande Boissière. The acquisition of this large property was made financially possible by Arthur Sweetser, who personally gave the school thousands of dollars and sought contributions from his network of affluent acquaintances. These donations included 25,000 U.S. dollars from John D. Rockefeller Jr.

Among Ecolint’s notable teachers during the early decades of its existence were Paul Dupuy, formerly doyen (dean) at Paris’ Ecole normale supérieure and defender of Alfred Dreyfus in the late 1890s; the psychoanalyst Charles Baudouin; the philosopher Jeanne Hersch; and the novelist Michel Butor.

The school became a foundation in 1968, and continued to evolve as it acquired new campuses. In 1974 it incorporated as its second campus La Châtaigneraie (also called "La Chât"), which had originally been founded in 1908 as the Ecole Nouvelle du Léman (later known as Collège Protestant Romand) near Founex in the Canton of Vaud.

The third campus, Campus des Nations, had two beginnings. The first was in the 1940s with Rigot, which subsequently became Pregny-Rigot, and the second in 2005 with the closure of Rigot and the opening of the purpose-made buildings at Saconnex. The Pregny-Rigot campus was a pre-Kindergarten through year 6 school that adopted the International Baccalaureate Primary Years Program in 2002. This campus had two buildings, Rigot (an old Swiss farmhouse near the Place des Nations), and Pregny, a modern architectural structure, adjacent to the United Nations' premises and close to the International Committee of the Red Cross. In 2005, Pregny-Rigot shifted with the opening of a new building at Saconnex, near the World Health Organization and the International Labour Organization. The early childhood classes at Rigot were moved to a renovated Pregny and Rigot was returned to the city of Geneva. Years 3–6 were moved from Pregny to the new building, Saconnex, which also opened a secondary school. The Secondary school offers the IB's Middle Years Programme, the IB Diploma and the IB Career-Related Programme (IBCP).

Languages offered 
Ecolint offers its core curriculum in English and French to varying degrees, depending on the campus and section.

Ecolint offers additional modern languages such as Spanish, German, Italian and Mandarin as part of its curriculum. Arabic, Dutch, Finnish, Japanese, Norwegian, Swahili, Swedish and many other languages are available via private tuition but can be counted towards credits or as IB programmes; this route is often chosen by students who have little other opportunity formally to study their mother tongue.

Campuses 
La Grande Boissière (also called "LGB") is the oldest and largest of the three. The primary school (beginning from age three) has approximately 550 students, and runs through grade 4. The middle school also has about 550 students, and runs from grade 5 to grade 8. The secondary school has around 800 students, beginning with 9th grade and going to grade 12 or 13. All three stages offer bilingual programmes.

La Châtaigneraie (also called "La Chât") became part of Ecolint in 1971 and is located in the Vaud countryside, near Founex, overlooking the Alps and Lake Léman. It has a primary and a secondary school, and has approximately 1600 students. The oldest building on campus is the main secondary building which was completed in 1908, when La Châtaigneraie first opened.

Campus des Nations (also simply called "Nations") opened in 2005 and operates on two locations in and in the vicinity of Grand Saconnex. It has around 1000 students. Campus des Nations is the only campus to offer all four IB programmes (PYP, MYP, IBDP and IBCP).

 Saconnex is located near the International Labour Organization and World Health Organization headquarters. Saconnex offers classes to 800 students from years 3 through 13. All classes taught at Nations follow the IB curriculum, consisting of PYP, MYP and DP or CP.
 Pregny (in Pregny-Chambésy) is located near the United Nations and Red Cross HQ and is a school of 200 students from pre-school and kindergarten to year 2.

Accreditation

Swiss
International School of Geneva's (upper) secondary education (middle and high school) is not approved as a Mittelschule/Collège/Liceo by the State Secretariat for Education, Research and Innovation (SERI).

International
Ecolint's various programmes are accredited by the Council of International Schools (CIS) and the Middle States Association (MSA). The last full accreditation was conducted in 2011, with an interim assessment in 2016.

Ecolint has satisfied the authorization procedures of the International Baccalaureate (IB) to offer the PYP, MYP, IBDP, and IBCP.

Campus La Châtaigneraie is an approved Cambridge Assessment school, offering IGCSEs.

Governance
The Governing Board appoints the Director General to which the latter is accountable. All alumni, current parents, teachers and other employees may vote in the Governing Board elections and may be elected as members. Three seats are permanently reserved for members appointed by the Cantons of Geneva and Vaud, and by the United Nations. The school’s personnel are represented on the Board by three appointed or elected observers (one from each campus), and the Staff Association has the right to nominate for full membership someone who is not a current employee of the school. Parents typically constitute a majority on the Governing Board. Kofi Annan was a member of the Board from 1981 to 1983. Ecolint’s governance was inspired by the direct democratic mechanisms of Switzerland. The Governing Board is accountable to all community members (parents, personnel and alumni) at the annual Consultative General Assembly and, when convened by members of the Ecolint community, at Extraordinary Consultative General Assemblies. In February 2002, one of these assemblies, held at the United Nations, was attended by some 1,000 people. It gave rise to a no-confidence referendum in June of that year involving all the school's eligible voters, the outcome of which forced the resignation of both the Governing Board’s Executive Committee and of the Director General.

Directors & Directors General

Directors (pre-Foundation)
 Paul Meyhoffer (1924–1928)
 Paul Miroglio (Interim, 1928–1929)
 Marie-Thérèse Maurette (1929–1949)
 Fred Roquette (1949–1964)
 Desmond Cole-Baker (English Language Programme) & Jean Meyer (French Language Programme) (1964–1967)

Directors General
 Irving Berenson (1967–1968)
 Asme Nawar (Interim, 1968)
 René-François Lejeune (1968–1978)
 Alden Lank (1978–1980)
 Leo Fernig (1980–1981)
 Joseph Blaney (1981–1983)
 Philip Thomas (Interim, 1983)
 Jan Ter Weele (1983–1986)
 Foundation Management Team (Interim, 1986–1987)
 Bernard Ivaldi (1987–1991)
 George Walker (1991–1999)
 Jean-Jacques Streuli (Interim, 1999–2000)
 Donald Billingsley (2000–2002)
 Council of Directors & Jean-Jacques Streuli (Interim, 2002–2003)
 Nicholas Tate (2003–2011)
 Vicky Tuck (2011–2017)
 David Hawley (2017–2023)
 Conrad Hughes (2023 - Present)

Notable alumni

The Charter of the International School of Geneva gives all registered alumni the right to vote in the elections for the school's Governing Board, and to be elected as Governing Board members.

Politics
Richard CorbettFormer member of the European Parliament and Labour Party (UK) leader in the Parliament
Álvaro de SotoPeruvian and UN diplomat
Indira GandhiPrime Minister of India; named "Woman of the Millennium" in a 1999 world-wide, online poll organised by the BBC
Michel HalpérinLawyer, Chairman of the Geneva Bar Association, member (Parti Libéral) and President of Geneva's Grand Conseil
Bob Rae21st Premier of Ontario, Leader of the Liberal Party of Canada, Canadian ambassador to the United Nations
Elizabeth Young, Lady KennetPeace and anti-nuclear campaigner, intellectual, writer

Science and medicine
Silvia BungeProfessor of Psychology and Advanced Research Fellow, University of California Berkeley; Director, Building Blocks of Cognition Laboratory; daughter of philosopher Mario Bunge
Gail CarpenterProfessor of Cognitive and Neural Systems and Professor of Mathematics, Boston University; Director of the Cognitive and Neural Systems Technology Laboratory
Dorland J. Davis Director of the National Institute of Allergy and Infectious Diseases from 1964 to 1975.
Ratko DjukanovicMedical researcher; Professor of Medicine, University of Southampton; Director of the Southampton NIHR Respiratory Biomedical Research Unit; Director of the NIHR Southampton Centre for Biomedical Research
Harold FurthAustrian-American physicist and former director of the Princeton Plasma Physics Laboratory
Daniel HaberDirector of the Massachusetts General Hospital Cancer Center, Professor of Oncology at Harvard Medical School, investigator of the Howard Hughes Medical Institute
Douglas HofstadterPulitzer Prize-winning author, Distinguished Professor of Cognitive Science and Comparative Literature at Indiana University, Director of the Center for Research on Concepts and Cognition
Mieko KamiyaJapanese psychiatrist and writer
Alan KosteleckýTheoretical physicist; Distinguished Professor of Physics at Indiana University, Bloomington
David LeachProfessor of Molecular Genetics, Head of School of Biological Sciences, Dean of Academic Excellence, University of Edinburgh
Stephen LeeProfessor of Solid State Chemistry, University of Michigan and Cornell University; son of Tsung-Dao Lee, Nobel Prize winner in Physics
David ShafferIrving Philips Professor of Child Psychiatry, Columbia University; Chief of Pediatric Psychiatry at New York–Presbyterian Hospital; Chief of the Division of Child and Adolescent Psychiatry, New York State Psychiatric Institute
Kellogg StelleProfessor of Physics, Theoretical Physics Group, Imperial College, London
Mark TruebloodAmerican engineer and astronomer, pioneer in the development of robotic telescopes
Carina TyrrellPhysician and clinical fellow at the Cambridge University Epidemiology Unit; model and former "Miss England"

Visual and performing arts
Milein CosmanPortrait artist, founder of the Cosman Keller Art and Music Trust
Joe DassinFrench-speaking American musician and pop star, famous for singing numerous hits such as Les Champs-Élysées
Maya Deren (born Eleonora Derenkowska)Cinema director, filmmaker and actress
Christopher LambertFrench actor famous for films such as Highlander and Greystoke
Lori LiebermanSinger and songwriter
Olivier PerezSwiss actor
Edouard van RemoortelFormer conductor of the Saint Louis Symphony Orchestra
Joseph RochlitzDocumentary filmmaker and opera director
Stuart SchulbergU.S. film and TV director and producer
Albert Sjoerdsma Jr.Playwright whose plays have been produced on Broadway
Maya StojanActress who plays the role of Tory Ellis in Castle (TV series)
SimoneAmerican singer and actress; daughter of Nina Simone
Alex WilsonPianist, composer, producer and arranger

Literature
Ilse Barker (born Ilse Gross, nom-de-plume Kathrine Talbot)German/British writer and poet
Roger BoylanAmerican novelist and critic
Alex BuzoAustralian playwright
Elizabeth FrankPulitzer Prize-winning author
Lucia GravesNovelist and translator; daughter of novelist, poet and scholar Robert Graves
Nicole KraussNovelist, short story writer

Law
David ChardavoyneAmerican attorney, professor, and author
Ronald M. GeorgeChief Justice, California Supreme Court
Peggy RayUNICEF Child Rights Lawyer of the Year (2001); International Baccalaureate pioneer graduate (1971)

Journalism
Harry AlbrightJournalist and former Editor of The Friend
Rami G. KhouriJournalist, director of the Issam Fares Institute at the American University of Beirut, editor-at-large of the Beirut-based Daily Star and co-laureate of the 2006 Pax Christi International Peace Award
Eric MargolisU.S.-born, international journalist

Economics
Hernando de Soto PolarPeruvian economist
Riad al KhouriEconomist, currently member of the board of directors, Global Challenges Forum, Switzerland
Edward A. TenenbaumU.S. economist who created the Deutsche Mark and helped to relaunch Germany's economy after World War II

Academia and scholarship
Shadi BartschAnn L. and Lawrence B. Buttenwieser Professor of Classics at the University of Chicago
Sissela Bok (née Myrdal)Swedish-U.S. philosopher and ethicist; daughter of two Nobel Prize winners
Isabel de MadariagaBritish historian; daughter of Spanish statesman, diplomat and writer Salvador de Madariaga

Others
Yasmin Aga KhanPhilanthropist, daughter of Prince Aly Khan and Rita Hayworth
Anjum AnandBritish Indian food writer and TV chef
Members of the Shihab dynasty
Nico ProstFrench professional racing driver; son of four-time Formula One world champion Alain Prost
Baron Edmond Adolphe de RothschildFinancier and philanthropist
Tatiana Santo Domingo (also known as Tatiana Casiraghi)Colombian-Monégasque heiress, socialite and fashion designer
Norman Schwarzkopf Jr.U.S. Army General and Commander of U.S. and coalition forces for Operation Desert Storm
Sirikit (Srikit Kitiyakara)Queen mother of Thailand
Lance Stroll - Belgian-Canadian Formula 1  racing driver
Lakshmi SundaramExecutive Director of Girls Not Brides NGO
Members of the Sursock family
Galyani VadhanaPrincess of Thailand and the elder sister of King Ananda Mahidol and King Bhumibol Adulyadej
 James VowlesTeam Principal for Williams Racing Formula 1 team
Lennie WaiteBritish track and field athlete
Anne-Marie WaltersWAAF officer and Special Operations Executive (SOE) agent for the United Kingdom in occupied France during World War II

As of 2015, around 6600 former students were registered on the School's Alumni website.

Gallery

References

External links

International School of Geneva
International School of Geneva: Libraries and Library Catalogues
Ecolint Alumni Web Community
International Baccalaureate Organization
Programmes Offered
La Châtaigneraie
La Grande Boissiere
Campus des Nations
Review from the Good Schools Guide International
International School of Geneva Arts Centre

Geneva
International Baccalaureate schools in Switzerland
Private schools in Switzerland
Educational institutions established in 1924
Schools in Geneva
1924 establishments in Switzerland